The Virginia Journal of International Law is a law review that was established in 1960 at the University of Virginia School of Law. It is among the world's most influential international law journals.  Pieces published in the Journal have been cited by the Supreme Court of the United States, multiple U.S. Circuit Courts of Appeals, and the International Court of Justice.

Scope 
The scope of the journal covers issues such as international commercial and trade law, international litigation and arbitration, international organizations, international humanitarian and human rights law, and comparative law.
It contains a mix of full-length articles, comments, essays, and book reviews, as well as notes, recent developments, and book notes.

References

External links
 

Journal
International law journals
Publications established in 1960
Quarterly journals
English-language journals
1960 establishments in Virginia
Law journals edited by students